The 650-foot (200 m) Dale Creek Crossing, completed in 1868  in the southeastern Wyoming Territory, presented engineers of the United States' first transcontinental railroad one of their most difficult challenges. Dale Creek Bridge, the longest bridge on the Union Pacific Railroad (UP), reached 150 feet (46 m) above Dale Creek, two miles (3.2 km) west of Sherman, Wyoming. The eastern approach to the bridge site, near the highest elevation on the UP, 8,247 feet (2,514 m) above sea level, required cutting through granite for nearly a mile. Solid rock also confronted workers on the west side of the bridge where they made a cut one mile (1.6 km) in length.

Originally built of wood, the trestle swayed in the wind as the first train crossed on April 23, 1868. In the days following, as carpenters rushed to shore up the bridge, two fell to their deaths. Still, the bridge's timbers flexed under the strain of passing trains.

The original bridge was replaced on the 1868 piers in 1876 by an iron bridge, manufactured by the American Bridge Company. The wooden approaches at each end remained in place when the iron bridge was built. The western approach caught fire in 1884, and was repaired. The UP installed girder spans and granite abutments to strengthen the bridge in 1885. Engineers installed guy wires on both the wooden bridge and its iron replacement in an attempt to stabilize the structures.

References

External links

Dale Creek Crossing at the Wyoming State Historic Preservation Office

Railroad bridges on the National Register of Historic Places in Wyoming
Buildings and structures in Albany County, Wyoming
Bridges completed in 1868
Transportation in Albany County, Wyoming
Railroad bridges in Wyoming
Union Pacific Railroad bridges
National Register of Historic Places in Albany County, Wyoming
Trestle bridges in the United States
Wooden bridges in the United States
Iron bridges in the United States